Jonathan Patrick Lamas (born October 16, 1974) is an American author, writer, and producer. In addition to his contributions as an automotive journalist for various automotive publications, he is known for such books as Out on My Own and Sanctuary of Expression. He is also known for his musical contributions as vocalist and guitarist of several Los Angeles bands. In 2005, Lamas played a bit part in the independent film Mute, directed by Melissa Joan Hart.

Bibliography 
1999, Sanctuary of Expression

2003, Out On My Own

Films and TV 
2005, Mute

External links
Jonathan Lamas' Official Web Site
About.Com Mustangs

1974 births
Living people
People from Texarkana, Texas
American male journalists
American male poets
Journalists from Texas
Guitarists from Texas
American male guitarists
21st-century American singers
21st-century American poets
21st-century American guitarists
21st-century American male singers
21st-century American male writers